The Austrian Archaeological Institute at Athens is one of the 19 foreign archaeological institutes operating in Athens, Greece. It is a branch of the Austrian Archaeological Institute based in Vienna.

Founded in 1898 by Otto Benndorf, it is the fifth oldest such institution in Greece. Its main role is to provide a basis for Austrian scholars active in Greece, and to facilitate Austrian-run archaeological projects in the country.

Excavations

During its long existence, the ÖAI Athen has been involved in excavations at Lousoi, Aigeira and Gremoulias (all in the modern province Achaia), at the site of Elis and in Kolonna (Aegina).

References

Bibliography
E. Korka, M. Xanthopoulou, E. Konstantinidi-Syvridi (editors), Foreign Archaeological Schools in Greece, 160 Years (Athens: Hellenic Ministry of Culture), 2006, p. 38-47.

External links
  ÖAI Athens website

Foreign Archaeological Institutes in Greece